Qué hombre tan simpático is a 1943 Mexican film. It stars Carlos Orellana.

External links
 

1943 films
1940s Spanish-language films
Mexican black-and-white films
Mexican comedy-drama films
1943 comedy-drama films
1940s Mexican films